Declaration of 18th SAARC Summit was made during SAARC Summit 2014 in Nepal.The 18th SAARC summit was held in Kathmandu, Nepal from 26 to 27 November 2014. The state heads of eight SAARC member countries along with their delegations had meeting during the Summit and discussed the agendas of SAARC. The discussions on previous implementations was made by the delegations before the summit.
They Recognized that after nearly thirty years of their existence, it was time to reinvigorate SAARC's regional cooperation and revitalize SAARC as an effective vehicle to fulfill the developmental aspirations of the peoples of South Asia;
Determined to deepen regional integration for peace and prosperity by promoting mutual trust, amity, understanding, cooperation and partnership;the 18th SAARC summit Declaration was made.

Declarations made in the summit

Regional cooperation
The Heads of State or Government expressed their strong determination to deepen regional integration for peace, stability and prosperity in South Asia by intensifying cooperation, inter alia, in trade, investment, finance, energy, security, infrastructure, connectivity and culture; and implementing projects, programmes and activities in a prioritized, result-oriented and time-bound manner.

South Asian Economic Union (SAEU)

The Leaders renewed their commitment to achieve South Asian Economic Union (SAEU) in a phased and planned manner through a Free Trade Area, a Customs Union, a Common Market, and a Common Economic and Monetary Union.
The Leaders acknowledged that SAARC Member States, particularly the Least Developed and Landlocked Member States, face structural constraints and challenges that result in their weak productive capacity affecting their competitiveness in external trade due to, among others, high trade and transit cost. They committed to enhance support to the Least Developed and Landlocked Member States in their development efforts, with a view to ensuring equitable benefits of free trade arrangements. In this context, they agreed to effectively implement the existing preferential facilities under SAFTA and SATIS.

SAFTA and Trade Facilitation
Directed SAFTA Ministerial Council and SAFTA Committee of Experts to accelerate free trade in goods and services in the region putting into operation simplified and transparent rules of origin; implementation of trade facilitation measures; harmonization of standards relating to Technical Barriers to Trade (TBT) and sanitary and phyto-sanitary measures; harmonized, streamlined and simplified customs procedures; elimination of non-tariff and para-tariff barriers; and smooth and efficient transit and transport facilities.  They also called for early operationalization of SATIS by finalizing the schedule of commitments.
They called for timely and comprehensive reforms of the global economic and financial architecture to make it inclusive and responsive to the needs of Least Developed, Land-locked, and Small Island Developing States (SIDS).
They reaffirmed that SIDS would require special attention in view of their unique circumstances and particular vulnerabilities in realization of sustainable development.

SAARC Development Fund
They agreed to strengthen the Social Window of the SAARC Development Fund (SDF) and operationalize its Economic Window and Infrastructure Window at the earliest for effective implementation of regional and sub-regional projects. In that context, they stressed on expeditious development of projects under SDF addressing the livelihood issues of the peoples of the region. They agreed to expand the Governing Board of SDF by including a representative of the National Focal Point of the Member States.

Connectivity
Heads of State or Government welcomed the significant progress towards finalization of the SAARC Motor Vehicles Agreement and SAARC Regional Railways Agreement and agreed to hold a Meeting of the Transport Ministers within three months in order to finalize the Agreements for approval.  They renewed their commitment to substantially enhance regional connectivity in a seamless manner through building and upgrading roads, railways, waterways infrastructure, energy grids, communications and air links to ensure smooth cross-border flow of goods, services, capital, technology and people. The leaders emphasized the need for linking  South Asia with contiguous regions, including Central Asia, and beyond by all modes of connectivity and directed relevant authorities to initiate national, regional and sub regional measures and necessary arrangements.

Energy
The Leaders directed the relevant SAARC bodies and mechanisms to identify regional and sub-regional projects in the area of power generation, transmission and power trade, including hydropower, natural gas, solar, wind and bio-fuel, and implement them with high priority with a view to meeting the increasing demand for power in the region.  The Leaders welcomed the signing of the SAARC Framework Agreement for Energy Cooperation (Electricity).

Poverty Alleviation
The Leaders reiterated their strong commitment to free South Asia from poverty and directed the Ministerial and Secretary-level mechanisms on poverty alleviation to review the progress and revisit the SAARC Plan of Action and its effective implementation, also taking into account the Post-2015 Development Agenda.
They recognized the potential of cooperatives in achieving inclusive, broad-based and sustainable economic growth and development, and called for sharing of experiences, expertise and best practices in this sector.

Post-2015 Development Goals
The Leaders recognized that the Post-2015 Development Agenda, following its adoption at the UN, would present opportunities to complement national and regional efforts on sustainable development. They directed to initiate an Inter-Governmental process to appropriately contextualize the Sustainable Development Goals (SDGs) at the regional level.

Agriculture and Food Security
The Heads of State or Government agreed to increase investment, promote research and development, facilitate technical cooperation and apply innovative, appropriate and reliable technologies in the agriculture sector for enhancing productivity to ensure food and nutritional security in the region. They also underscored the importance of promoting sustainable agriculture. The Leaders directed to eliminate the threshold criteria from the SAARC Food Bank Agreement so as to enable the Member States to avail food grains, during both emergency and normal time food difficulty. The Leaders urged for early ratification of the SAARC Seed Bank Agreement and directed to constitute the Seed Bank Board, pending completion of ratification by all Member States. The Leaders also directed the relevant SAARC bodies to finalize the establishment of Regional Vaccine Bank and Regional Livestock Gene Bank.

Environment

They directed the relevant bodies/mechanisms for effective implementation of SAARC Agreement on Rapid Response to Natural Disasters, SAARC Convention on Cooperation on Environment and Thimphu Statement on Climate Change, including taking into account the existential threats posed by climate change to some SAARC Member States. They welcomed the decision to establish the SAARC Environment and Disaster Management Centre. The Leaders underlined the urgency for the global community to arrive at a Protocol, another legal instrument, or an agreed outcome with legal force applicable to all by the end of 2015, based on the principles of Common but Differentiated Responsibility (CBDR), Respective Capabilities and Equity under the UNFCCC.

Blue Economy
They recognized the manifold contributions of ocean-based Blue Economy in the SAARC Region and the need for collaboration and partnership in this area.

Health
The Leaders recognized the importance of achieving universal health coverage (UHC), improving health regulatory systems, preparedness for emerging and reemerging diseases, and the challenges posed by anti-microbial resistance and non-communicable diseases. They endorsed the Malé Resolution on Regional Health Issues adopted at the Fourth Meeting of the SAARC Health Ministers. They urged to continue the remarkable progress by SAARC countries in the last decade in response to AIDS with the aim to end AIDS epidemic in the region by 2030. They also directed to complete all necessary processes for upgrading the SAARC TB Reference Laboratory at SAARC TB and HIV/AIDS Centre (STAC), Kathmandu to Supra-national Reference Laboratory with necessary funding from SDF.

Education
The Heads of State or Government expressed their resolve to eliminating illiteracy from the region in line with the global goal of education for all and ensuring quality education in all institutions by reforming curricula, teaching methods and evaluation systems adequately supported by physical, technical and other facilities. The leaders agreed to promote regional cooperation in the field of vocational education and training. They directed their Education Ministers to develop a Regional Strategy for Enhancing the Quality of Education in order to raise the standards of South Asian educational institutions in order to better serve the youth in the region. The Leaders welcomed the progress with regard to the South Asian University.

Youth
They emphasized the need for adopting appropriate national policies and programmes for utilizing the youth force and their skills for economic and social development, especially through the creation of productive self-employment opportunities. The Leaders welcomed the declaration of July 15 as the World Youth Skills Day at the 69th Session of the UN General Assembly and agreed to commemorate, as appropriate, the said event by SAARC.

Women and Children
They directed the relevant authorities to take effective measures for preventing the trafficking in women and children and their exploitation.

Social Protection
The Leaders acknowledged the special needs of the elderly, women, children, differently-abled persons, unemployed persons, and persons working at hazardous sites and agreed to develop and strengthen social protection for them and to share best practices in this regard.

Migration
They also agreed to collaborate and cooperate on safe, orderly and responsible management of labour migration from South Asia to ensure safety, security and wellbeing of their migrant workers in the destination countries outside the region.

Science and Technology
The Leaders agreed to develop capacity of the Member States to apply space technology for socio-economic development and the welfare of the peoples through experience sharing among themselves. In this context, they welcomed the offer of India to develop and launch a satellite dedicated to SAARC Countries.

Telecommunication
The Leaders directed for collaboration and engagement among public authorities and private stakeholders in the Member States to lower telephone tariff rates for facilitating greater contacts among the people of the region and called for rationalization of the tariff structures.

Tourism
The Leaders expressed their resolve for making South Asia an attractive common tourist destination in a sustainable manner. They directed relevant bodies to effectively implement SAARC Action Plan on Tourism (2006) particularly through initiating appropriate public-private collaboration. They also called for effective and full implementation of their existing decision to charge nationals of SAARC Member States fees for entry into archaeological and heritage sites as applicable to their own nationals.

Culture
They directed to effectively implement the SAARC Agenda for Culture and agreed to take measures to preserve and restitute the South Asian cultural property and create a SAARC heritage list together with the operational guidelines.   They declared the year 2016 as the SAARC Year of Cultural Heritage and tasked the relevant bodies to develop an action plan for its success.  They also agreed to develop a cultural trail linking major Buddhist historical sites in the region. The Leaders further agreed to facilitate access of persons visiting prominent and holy sites of Islam, Hinduism, Christianity and all other major religions in South Asia.

Media
The Leaders, recognizing the reach and influence of media, urged both public and private media to share responsibility in the efforts towards promoting understanding and cohesiveness of the SAARC Member States and their peoples.

Combating Terrorism and trans-national Crimes
The Leaders unequivocally condemned terrorism and violent extremism in all its forms and manifestations and underlined the need for effective cooperation among the Member States to combat them. They directed respective authorities to ensure full and effective implementation of the SAARC Regional Convention on Suppression of Terrorism and its Additional Protocol, including through enacting necessary legislations at the national level to root out terrorism. They reiterated their call for an early conclusion of a UN Comprehensive Convention on International Terrorism. They agreed to take effective measures to combat illicit trafficking of narcotics and psychotropic substances, arms smuggling, money laundering, counterfeit currency and other transnational crimes. They also agreed to establish a cyber crime monitoring desk.

Governance

They reiterated their strong commitment to ensure good governance for sustainable development by promoting accountability, transparency, the rule of law and people's participation at all levels of governance.

The Leaders, while expressing satisfaction over steady progress in democratization in South Asia, committed to further promote and institutionalize peace, stability, democracy and development as the common aspirations of the peoples of South Asia. In this context, they agreed on the need for cooperation and collaboration within SAARC on issues of common interest and concern to Member States.

Strengthening SAARC processes

The Heads of State or Government acknowledged the need to enhance the visibility and stature of SAARC in international fora by, inter alia, forging common positions on issues of mutual interest and seeking group recognition in various multilateral institutions.

The Leaders directed all SAARC bodies, including the Council of Ministers, sectoral Ministerial, other bodies and institutions to develop outcome-oriented policies, programmes, projects, and activities.  The Leaders directed rationalization of the work of the SAARC mechanisms, which could  be reviewed inter-governmentally every three years by a regular session of the Standing Committee with a view to evaluate performance, achievements and constraints.

The Leaders agreed to enhance the role of the Secretaria, commensurate with the objectives of SAARC, its areas of cooperation as well as the decisions and agreements reached in the past. They committed to enhance the institutional capacity of the SAARC Secretariat, in keeping with emerging realities, to enable it to fulfill the responsibilities entrusted to it, in an effective and efficient manner.

The Leaders expressed satisfaction on the decision to rationalize the number and activities of SAARC Regional Centers through their selective closure and merger.  They reiterated their resolve to make the remaining SAARC Regional Centres and specialized institutions efficient, effective and result-oriented and directed these institutions to initiate programmes and projects that produce tangible outcomes.

They agreed to hold henceforth the meetings of the SAARC Summit every two years or earlier, if necessary, the Council of Ministers once a year, the Standing Committee at least once a year, and the Programming Committee at least twice a year. They also agreed to make the Programming Committee a Charter body of SAARC.

Nineteenth Summit

The Leaders welcomed the offer of the Government of Islamic Republic of Pakistan to host the Nineteenth Summit of SAARC in 2016. The summit can not take place in Islamabad. Other Date is uncertain.

External links

References

South Asian Association for Regional Cooperation